Humberto Albert Mejía (born March 3, 1997) is a Panamanian professional baseball pitcher in the New York Mets organization. He previously played in MLB for the Miami Marlins and Arizona Diamondbacks.

Career

Miami Marlins
On September 16, 2013, Mejía signed with the Miami Marlins as an international free agent. He did not appear in a professional game until 2015 when he played for the DSL Marlins, and went 3–3 with a 1.69 ERA over  innings.

In 2016, Mejía split the season between the GCL Marlins and the Batavia Muckdogs, going 4–5 with a 2.90 ERA over  innings.

In 2017, Mejía missed the season due to injury.

In 2018, Mejía returned to Batavia, going 1–6 with a 3.30 ERA over innings. 

In 2019, Mejía split the season between the Clinton LumberKings and the Jupiter Hammerheads, going a combined 5–2 with a 2.09 ERA over  innings. Following the season, he was added to the Marlins 40–man roster.

On August 7, 2020, Mejía made his MLB debut against the New York Mets and pitched 2.1 innings of one-run ball.

Arizona Diamondbacks
On August 31, 2020, Mejía, Caleb Smith, and Julio Frias were traded to the Arizona Diamondbacks in exchange for Starling Marte. Mejía made 5 appearances for the Diamondbacks in 2021. He went 0–3 with a 7.25 ERA and 20 strikeouts. He was designated for assignment on April 7, 2022. On April 10, Mejía was sent outright to the Triple-A Reno Aces. He was released on May 24th.

Mexican League
On June 4, 2022, Mejía signed with the Guerreros de Oaxaca of the Mexican League. In 3 starts, he posted a 0–2 record with a 7.71 ERA. Mejía was released on June 24, 2022. On June 26, 2022, Mejía signed with the Mariachis de Guadalajara. On August 1, 2022, Mejía was traded to the Toros de Tijuana.

New York Mets
On January 4, 2023, Mejia signed a minor league deal with the New York Mets.

International career
Mejía was selected to represent Panama at the 2023 World Baseball Classic qualification.

References

External links

1997 births
Living people
Amarillo Sod Poodles players
Arizona Diamondbacks players
Batavia Muckdogs players
Clinton LumberKings players
Dominican Summer League Marlins players
Panamanian expatriate baseball players in the Dominican Republic
Panamanian expatriate baseball players in Mexico
Guerreros de Oaxaca players
Gulf Coast Marlins players
Jupiter Hammerheads players
Mariachis de Guadalajara players
Panamanian expatriate baseball players in the United States
Major League Baseball pitchers
Major League Baseball players from Panama
Miami Marlins players
Reno Aces players
Sportspeople from Panama City
Leones del Escogido players
2023 World Baseball Classic players